Mojtaba Mobinipour (born 25 December 1990) is an Iranian professional footballer.

Career statistics

References

1990 births
Living people
People from Qom
Iranian footballers
Saba players
Persian Gulf Pro League players
Azadegan League players
Association football central defenders